Marc Oliver Opresnik (born September 27, 1969) is a German professor, scholar, author and researcher. He is a professor of business administration with focus on marketing at the Lübeck University of Applied Sciences in Germany and Chief Research Officer at Kotler Impact Inc., the organization founded by the American marketing professor Philip Kotler. His research is about Social Media Marketing and Communication as well as Negotiation and he is the author of more than 30 publications in these subject areas, including Marketing Management, Marketing: An Introduction, Social Media Marketing and The Hidden Rules of Successful Negotiation and Communication.

Career
Marc Oliver Opresnik studied business administration at the University of Hamburg. In 1998 he completed his Ph.D. on ”Corporate Culture in the USA and Germany“. He has worked for ten years in management and strategy positions at a global corporation.
 
Since 2008, Marc Oliver Opresnik has been Professor of Business Administration, in particular Marketing and Management at the Technische Hochschule Lübeck, a public corporation. He is also serves as Deputy Director at the Institute for Entrepreneurship and Business Development. In addition, he is a visiting professor and affiliate member to other international universities such as Regent's University London and East China University of Science and Technology in Shanghai.

Since 2013 Opresnik has been a director of the board of SGMI Management Institut St. Gallen in Switzerland.
 
In March 2014, he also became Chief Research Officer at Kotler Impact Inc, Philip Kotler's global company and a speaker and expert of the World Marketing Summit.

He is the global co-author to marketing professor Philip Kotler and also member of the editorial board of several scientific journals.

Besides his research and teaching, he works as a trainer, keynote speaker and advisor for international corporations, institutions and governments.

Selected publications

References

 https://www.kotlerimpact.com/speakers/marc-oliver-opresnik/
 https://www.opresnik-management-consulting.de/en/management-english/
 https://www.th-luebeck.de/hochschule/hochschulorganisation/personalverzeichnis/person/marc-oliver-opresnik/
 “Social Media Marketing: A Practitioner Guide” – An Interview with Marc Opresnik for The Marketing Journal
 German interview with the german magazine Deutschlandradio
 German interview with Prof. Marc Opresnik by GEDANKENtanken
 TV Interview at the World Marketing Summit 2014 in Japan

External links

Academic staff of the Technical University of Applied Sciences Lübeck
Marketing theorists
1969 births
Living people
University of Hamburg alumni
People from Duisburg
21st-century German male writers
Chief research officers
21st-century German businesspeople
German business executives